Filipe Francisco dos Santos (born 24 July 1987), known as Cafu is a Brazilian footballer

Biography
Born in São Paulo, Cafu started his career with Campeonato Paulista Segunda Divisão side Velo Clube (São Paulo state 4th level, based in Rio Claro). He scored once in 12 league appearances in 2008 season and 10 goals in 11 appearances in 2007 season, all goals were scored in the first stage of the league .

In January 2009, he joined Czech club Příbram from São Paulo side Velo Clube. He played 10 league matches for the first team and also played for the B team. In January 2010, he left for Slovak side Petržalka. He scored a goal on 18 April.

In July 2010 he returned to Velo Clube.

References

External links
 Guardian Football
 
 
 Příbram Profile 
 CBF 

Brazilian footballers
Brazilian expatriate footballers
Czech First League players
Slovak Super Liga players
1. FK Příbram players
FC Petržalka players
Expatriate footballers in the Czech Republic
Expatriate footballers in Slovakia
Brazilian expatriate sportspeople in Slovakia
Brazilian expatriate sportspeople in the Czech Republic
Association football forwards
Footballers from São Paulo
1987 births
Living people